Cary Augustus Hardee (November 13, 1876 – November 21, 1957) was an American educator, lawyer, legislator, and banker who served as the 23rd Governor of Florida.

Biography

Early life and career 
Born in Taylor County, Florida, he spent most of his life in Live Oak, Florida. He was a teacher until 1900 when he was admitted to the bar and began practicing law. Additionally, he was a banker, establishing the First National Bank of Live Oak in 1902 and later serving as its president. He also organized the Mayo State Bank and was president of the Branford State Bank.

Political career 
In 1905 he became the state's attorney for the Third Judicial District. He served as a member of the Florida House of Representatives from 1915 to 1919, and was speaker of the Florida House.

Gubernatorial campaign issues 
Hardee identified his positions on the issues of better and more efficient government, taxation, waterways and roads, agriculture, and veterans' affairs in a 1920 newspaper article.

Governorship 
He took office as governor on January 4, 1921. During his term, the state adopted constitutional amendments that reapportioned the legislature and prohibited the levying of state income and inheritance taxes along with starting the first state gasoline tax. Six counties would be created during his tenure as governor. He also halted the practice of leasing state prisoners out to private businesses. During his term as governor, electrocution became a legal method of execution in Florida.

He offered to send in National Guard troops in response to the Rosewood Massacre but the local sheriff refused the offer.

Post-governorship 
Hardee left office on January 6, 1925. He ran for governor again in 1932, but lost the Democratic primary.

He was a banker in Live Oak until his death in 1957.

Honors and memorials 
Hardee County, Florida is named in his honor.

Electoral history

References

External links 
 Official Governor's portrait and biography from the State of Florida
 
A photograph of Cary A. Hardee and his cabinet from Florida Memory ran by the Florida State Library and Archives of Florida.

1876 births
1957 deaths
Democratic Party governors of Florida
Speakers of the Florida House of Representatives
Democratic Party members of the Florida House of Representatives
People from Taylor County, Florida
People from Live Oak, Florida